A penumbral lunar eclipse took place on 7 July 2009, the second of four lunar eclipses in 2009. This eclipse entered only the southernmost tip of the penumbral shadow and thus was predicted to be very difficult to observe visually.  This lunar eclipse was the predecessor of the solar eclipse of 22 July 2009.

Eclipse Season 

This is the first eclipse this season.

Second eclipse this season: 22 July 2009 Total Solar Eclipse

Third eclipse this season: 6 August 2009 Penumbral Lunar Eclipse

Visibility 

It was predicted to be seen rising over Australia after dusk on 7 July and setting over western North and South America in the early predawn hours of 7 July.

Map

Related lunar eclipses

Eclipses of 2009 
 An annular solar eclipse on 26 January.
 A penumbral lunar eclipse on 9 February.
 A penumbral lunar eclipse on 7 July.
 A total solar eclipse on 22 July.
 A penumbral lunar eclipse on 6 August.
 A partial lunar eclipse on 31 December.

Lunar year (354 days) 

This eclipse is one of five lunar eclipses in a short-lived series. The lunar year series repeats after 12 lunations or 354 days (Shifting back about 10 days in sequential years). Because of the date shift, the Earth's shadow will be about 11 degrees west in sequential events.

Saros series 

This eclipse is a member of Saros series 110. The previous event occurred on 27 June 1991.  The next event is on 18 July 2027 which will end the series.

Half-Saros cycle 
A lunar eclipse will be preceded and followed by solar eclipses by 9 years and 5.5 days (a half saros). This lunar eclipse is related to two partial solar eclipses of Solar Saros 117.

See also 

List of lunar eclipses and List of 21st-century lunar eclipses
 :File:2009-07-07 Lunar Eclipse Sketch.gif Chart

Notes

External links 
 
 Penumbral Eclipse of the Moon: 2009 July 07
 Eclipses During 2009 
 http://www.shadowandsubstance.com/

2009-07
2009 in science